Our Lady of Snows Shrine Basilica is located at Thoothukudi, Tamil Nadu, India. It is one of the Catholic pilgrimage centers in India dedicated to the Our Lady of Snows, a title given to Mother Mary. The Shrine name refers to the Basilica di Santa Maria Maggiore in Rome.

Notable Parish Priests 

Servant of God Rev Fr. Antony Soosainather

See also
 Other Catholic pilgrimage centres: 
 Basilica of Our Lady of Snow, Pallippuram, Ernakulam, Kerala, India
Basilica of Our Lady of Good Health, Velankanni, Tamil Nadu, India
 Holy Cross Church, Manapad, Tamil Nadu, India
 Poondi Matha Basilica (Our Lady of Lourdes Basilica, Poondi), Tamil Nadu, India
 Kamanayakkanpatti Church of Our Lady of Assumption 
 Immaculate heart of Mary's Church, Sathankulam
 Our Lady of Snow Kallikulam (Our Lady of Snow Church, Kallikulam), Tamil Nadu, India
 St. Stephen's Church, Kombuthurai
 Our Lady of Snows, Maravankudieruppu, Nagercoil
 Our Lady of Snows, South Thamaraikulam, Nagercoil
 List of Jesuit sites

References

External links
www.snowsbasilica.com
www.snowschurch.org
History of Our Lady of Snows

Basilica churches in Tamil Nadu
Catholic pilgrimage sites
Shrines to the Virgin Mary
Roman Catholic churches in Tamil Nadu
Thoothukudi
Churches in Thoothukudi district
Roman Catholic shrines in India